The Masonic Temple in Cheyenne, Wyoming, is a building dating from 1901. It was listed on the National Register of Historic Places in 1984.

It is a 3-story buff brick-veneer building with a concrete foundation.  The building burned in 1903 and was rebuilt with very few changes.  An addition was added in 1929.

References

External links
 Masonic Temple at the Wyoming State Historic Preservation Office

Masonic buildings completed in 1901
Buildings and structures in Cheyenne, Wyoming
Masonic buildings in Wyoming
Clubhouses on the National Register of Historic Places in Wyoming
National Register of Historic Places in Cheyenne, Wyoming